John Sutherland may refer to:

Politicians
 John Sutherland (New South Wales politician) (1816–1889), member of the NSW Legislative Assembly and Council
 John Sutherland (Canadian senator) (1821–1899), Canadian Senator from Manitoba
 John Sutherland (Manitoba politician) (1837–1922), provincial politician in Manitoba, Canada
 John Sutherland (British politician) (1854–1918), Scottish Liberal politician

Nobility
 John of Sutherland (1344–1361), Scottish noble
 John Sutherland, 7th Earl of Sutherland (died 1460), chief of the Clan Sutherland
 John Sutherland, 8th Earl of Sutherland (died 1508), chief of the Clan Sutherland
 John Sutherland, 9th Earl of Sutherland (died 1514), chief of the Clan Sutherland

Film and TV
John Sutherland, character in Altars of Desire
 John Sutherland (producer) (1910–2001), producer who played the adult Bambi in the 1942 film, Bambi
 John Harrison (director), who is sometimes credited as John Sutherland

Academics
 John Sutherland (AI researcher)
 John Sutherland (physician) (1808–1891), physician and promoter of sanitary science
 John Sutherland (Canadian writer) (1919–1956), Canadian poet, literary critic, and magazine editor
 John Sutherland (author) (born 1938), English academic, newspaper columnist and author
 John Sutherland (chemist) (born 1962), British chemist
 John Derg Sutherland (1905–1991), Scottish psychoanalyst
 John W. Sutherland (born 1958), professor of environmental and ecological engineering at Purdue University
 John Francis Sutherland (1854–1912), Scottish physician

Others
 Jock Sutherland (1889–1948), American football coach
 John Steven Sutherland (born 1983), American musician, lead singer for the B3 boy band
 J. W. Sutherland (John Waters Sutherland, 1870–1946), mining engineer and metallurgist in Western Australia
 John Sutherland (footballer) (1904–1955), Australian rules footballer
 John Sutherland, Ontario crown attorney; former director of the Special Investigations Unit

See also
 Jonathan Sutherland (born 1977), Scottish television and radio presenter